The 2014 Copa do Brasil First Round was played from 12 March to 7 May 2014, to decide the 40 teams advancing to the Second Round.

First round

|}

Match 1

Vasco da Gama won 1–0 on aggregate.

Match 2

Treze won 3–2 on aggregate.

Match 3

Ponte Preta advanced directly due to winning by 2 or more goals difference.

Match 4

Paraná won 4–2 on aggregate.

Match 5

Tied 2–2 on aggregate, J. Malucelli won on penalties.

Match 6

Novo Hamburgo won 3–2 on aggregate.

Match 7

Atlético Goianiense won 3–2 on aggregate.

Match 8

ABC won 4–2 on aggregate.

Match 9

Santos won 3–0 on aggregate.

Match 10

Tied 5–5 on aggregate, Princesa do Solimões won on away goals.

Match 11

Londrina won 3–2 on aggregate.

Match 12

Tied 2–2 on aggregate, Grêmio Barueri won on away goals.

Match 13

Palmeiras won 3–0 on aggregate.

Match 14

Sampaio Corrêa won 5–3 on aggregate.

Match 15

Avaí advanced directly due to winning by 2 or more goals difference.

Match 16

ASA advanced directly due to winning by 2 or more goals difference.

Match 17

Fluminense won 6–3 on aggregate.

Match 18

Tupi advanced directly due to winning by 2 or more goals difference.

Match 19

Tied 1–1 on aggregate, Náutico won on penalties.

Match 20

América de Natal won 4–1 on aggregate.

Match 21

Corinthians advanced directly due to winning by 2 or more goals difference.

Match 22

Nacional won 4–3 on aggregate.

Match 23

Bahia won 3–1 on aggregate.

Match 24

América Mineiro advanced directly due to winning by 2 or more goals difference.

Match 25

Botafogo won 2–0 on aggregate.

Match 26

Santa Cruz won 4–1 on aggregate.

Match 27

Tied 2–2 on aggregate, Potiguar won on away goals.

Match 28

Santa Rita won 2–1 on aggregate.

Match 29

São Paulo won 4–0 on aggregate.

Match 30

CRB won 4–2 on aggregate.

Match 31

Figueirense won 3–1 on aggregate.

Match 32

Bragantino won 1–0 on aggregate.

Match 33

Coritiba won 4–2 on aggregate.

Match 34

Caldense won 4–2 on aggregate.

Match 35

Sport advanced directly due to winning by 2 or more goals difference.

Match 36

Paysandu won 4–3 on aggregate.

Match 37

Internacional advanced directly due to winning by 2 or more goals difference.

Match 38

Cuiabá won 2–0 on aggregate.

Match 39

Ceará won 5–1 on aggregate.

Match 40

Chapecoense advanced directly due to winning by 2 or more goals difference.

Notes

References

2014 Copa do Brasil